Turrisaspis elektor is an extinct species of groenlandaspid arthrodire placoderm . It is known only from trunk fragments from the Catskill Formation from the Upper Devonian of Clinton County, Pennsylvania .

References

Arthrodire genera
Placoderms of North America
Fossil taxa described in 2003
Paleontology in Pennsylvania
Late Devonian animals